Soloella orientis is a species of moth in the family Erebidae. The species is known only from Kenya.

External links
 Species info

Aganainae
Moths of Africa
Moths described in 2007